NÖVOG is a public transport operator, owned by the provincial government of Lower Austria. It holds concessions for a number of regional and heritage railways.

Operations

NÖVOG's transport concessions include:
 Wiesel buses: A regional bus service, with a fleet including 47 new Setra buses
 Light rail services in Waidhofen/Ybbs
 Mariazell Railway, taken over from ÖBB in December 2010
 The rack railway section of Schneeberg Railway, between Puchberg am Schneeberg and Hochschneeberg
 Waldviertelbahn

References

External links
 

Railway companies of Austria
Economy of Lower Austria